The Leyland Hundred (also known as Leylandshire) is a historic subdivision of the English county of Lancashire.  It covered the parishes of Brindle, Chorley, Croston, Eccleston, Hoole, Leyland, Penwortham, Rufford, Standish and Tarleton.

In the Domesday Book the area was recorded as 'Lailand' Hundred, with Chorley Parish in Warmundestrou Hundred and Eccleston Parish in Duddeston Hundred, all included in the returns for Cheshire.  However, it cannot be said clearly to have been part of Cheshire.

Notes and references

Bibliography
Crosby, A. (1996). A History of Cheshire. (The Darwen County History Series.) Chichester, West Sussex, UK: Phillimore & Co. Ltd. .
Harris, B. E., and Thacker, A. T. (1987). The Victoria History of the County of Chester. (Volume 1: Physique, Prehistory, Roman, Anglo-Saxon, and Domesday). Oxford: Oxford University Press. .
Morgan, P. (1978). Domesday Book Cheshire: Including Lancashire, Cumbria, and North Wales. Chichester, Sussex: Phillimore & Co. Ltd. .
Phillips A. D. M., and Phillips, C. B. (2002),  A New Historical Atlas of Cheshire. Chester, UK: Cheshire County Council and Cheshire Community Council Publications Trust. .

Hundreds of Lancashire